Leona allyni is a butterfly in the family Hesperiidae. It is found in the Democratic Republic of the Congo.

References

Butterflies described in 1971
Erionotini
Endemic fauna of the Democratic Republic of the Congo